Stratosphere is the debut studio album by American slowcore band Duster. The album was released February 24, 1998, on the Up Records label in the United States.

The album was primarily written and recorded by members Clay Parton and Canaan Dove Amber, with Jason Albertini contributing drums to three tracks. The band subsequently released the Contemporary Movement album in 2000, and Stratosphere was reissued as part of the Capsule Losing Contact box set in March 2019.

Cover
The album's cover is a photograph taken from a November 1970 issue of Life magazine taken by Sam Ehrlich in Alberta, Canada.

Acclaim 
The album got little to no attention on its initial release. Due to the Internet, the album has now made itself an icon in the indie rock community and its most popular track, Inside Out, has over 96 million plays on Spotify.

Track listing

Personnel
Dove Amber (credited as C. Amber)– performance, production, mixing
Clay Parton (credited as E. Parton)– performance, production, mixing
Jason Albertini – drums 
Phil Ek – production 
Kip Beelman – assistant production 
Chris – assistant production 
Jeff Pinn – recording

References

Duster (band) albums
Up Records albums
1998 debut albums